Suba South is a constituency in Kenya. It is one of eight constituencies in Homa Bay County.

Suba South Constituency Wards.

The Constinuency is sub divided into four wards namely;

1.Kaksingri West

2.Gwassi North 

3.Gwassi South

4.Ruma Kaksingri East

References 

Constituencies in Homa Bay County